Ron Hugh  ( – ) was a Welsh international footballer. He was part of the Wales national football team, playing 1 match on 1 February 1930 against Ireland.

See also
 List of Wales international footballers (alphabetical)

References

1909 births
Welsh footballers
Wales international footballers
Place of birth missing
Date of death missing
Wales amateur international footballers
Association footballers not categorized by position